Pratap Singh is an Indian politician and a member of the Indian National Congress party.

Political career
He became an MLA for the first time in 2013.

Legal Affairs
His son-in-law had tried to encroach upon a land of a local farmer, who in retaliation fired bullets on him, leading to a brawl and arrests.

See also
Madhya Pradesh Legislative Assembly
2013 Madhya Pradesh Legislative Assembly election

References

1961 births
Living people
Indian National Congress politicians from Madhya Pradesh
Madhya Pradesh MLAs 2013–2018